Heim is the German, Norwegian, Icelandic and Faroese equivalent of the English word home. It is a common German and Norwegian suffix in place names such as Mannheim and Trondheim.  In Norwegian place names, the suffix is often weakened to just -um, -eim, -im, or even just -m, such as in Bærum, Elverum, Modum, Sørum, Bjerkreim, Askim and Sem.  The old form has been revived in some names such as Austrheim, Grindheim, Jessheim, and Jotunheimen.

Heim may refer to:

People
 Heim (surname), a list of people with this surname
 Heims (surname), a list of people with this surname

Places
 Heim, Norway, a municipality in Trøndelag county, Norway 
 Heim (village), a village in the municipality of Hemne in Trøndelag county, Norway
 Heim (former municipality), a former municipality in the old Sør-Trøndelag county, Norway
 Heim Glacier, Antarctica
 Heim Glacier (Greenland)
 Heim Peninsula, a peninsula on Ellesmere Island in Nunavut, Canada
 Heims Lake, a lake in Minnesota

Others
 Heim theory, a collection of ideas about the fundamental laws of physics
 Heim, a 2011 album by Icelandic singer Jón Jónsson
 HeIM, a Scanning helium ion microscope

See also
 Chayyim
 Haim (disambiguation)
 Heym